Salagama (also known as Saliya and Salagama Brahakmana Vanshaya) is a Sinhalese caste found mostly in the southern coastal areas of Sri Lanka. The community was traditionally associated with the cultivation and management of cinnamon and were formerly also involved as weavers and soldiers.

Etymology 
The Salagamas were also known as Saliya, also spelled Chaliya. The name is presumably derived from Chale of Kerala.

History

Origins

The Salagamas trace their roots back to the Coromandel Coast and Malabar Coast of South India, and settled in the southern coastal areas of Sri Lanka. Their ancestors were a weaving community who were known as Saliya also known as Devanga Chettiar of South India. Some Salagamas also have the vasagama or surname "Nambudirige" meaning "of the Nambudiri", which Prof. Gananath Obeyesekere deems as a spurious attempt by the caste to elevate their status to that of the Nambudiri Brahmins of Kerala (Due to caste competition with the Karava who claimed Kshatriya status). Like the other coastal castes such as the Karavas and Duravas, the Salagamas migrated to Sri Lanka between 13th to 18th century.

Colonial period

Under Portuguese rule, many Karavas and Salagamas converted to Catholicism, which opened way to education and administrative careers.

The Portuguese continued the tradition of using Salagamas as cinnamon planters, who had to provide cinnamon as a tax. Queyroz mentions 'Chaleaz' as among the 'high castes' and that they prepared cinnamon for the 'great tax'.

When the Dutch East India Company (VOC) took over the coastal areas, it re-organised cinnamon cultivation on modern capitalist lines, with plantations located within the boundaries of VOC rule, mainly in the Galle district. The Salagamas were converted from a feudal caste into a modern proletariat.The Dutch demand for cinnamon was more intense than that of the Portuguese, and by the era of British control mortality rates among Salagamas had increased sharply. It became common practice for cinnamon peelers' children to be registered under the names of other castes in order to spare them a life of ever-growing misery.

The census of 1824 identified the Salagamas as about 7.5% of the coastal Sinhalese population. However, they were concentrated in the Galle district, where about half of them lived and where they made up almost 20% of the population.

Sub-castes 
Traditionally, the Salagama were divided into four sub-castes:
 Hewapanne ('warriors' & military officers/generals)
 Panividakara  ('Special messengers') or - headmen (equal to Mohottalas)
 Kurundukara (Kurunthukarar in Tamil means ('cinnamon workers').

However, in modern times there is a simple twofold division between the Hewapanne and the Kurundukara. The former are of higher status, including landowners in their ranks, the "Kurundukara's"  enjoyed a high status in Sinhala society, before being punished by the King of Kotte in 1406 and downgraded to a lower status, who also imposed cinnamon as a tax, at one stage the tax exceeded their manpower, and became virtually unbearable, and it took a heavy toll in their mortality rate,  some of them were subsequently forced to change their names to other castes to escape it.

Occupations 
Today, the Salagama predominance in cinnamon cultivation has declined, the higher status gained by the caste leading to its members abandoning their traditional occupation. Many Salagamas in the Hikkaduwa area became coral miners until the Boxing Day Tsunami of 2004 swept away their villages. The coral-lime kilns gave employment to many more.

The Railway made access to employment in Colombo and other urban centres very much easier, and the caste became a very important part of the working class. Its higher echelons became notable in the engineering profession, mainly due to the influence of Sir Cyril de Zoysa, who owned the South Western Omnibus Company (see Ceylon Transport Board) and the Associated Motorways Group, and other businessmen in the motor trade.

Buddhist revival 
By the mid 18th century, upasampada (higher ordination, as distinct from samanera or novice ordination) had become extinct in Sri Lanka. The Buddhist order had become extinct three times during the preceding five hundred years and was re-established in the reigns of Vimala Dharma Suriya I (1591–1604) and Vimala Dharma Suriya II (1687–1707) as well. These re-establishments were short lived. On the initiative of Ven. Weliwita Saranankara (1698–1778) the Thai monk Upali Thera visited Kandy during the reign of king Kirti Sri Rajasinghe (1747–1782) and once again reestablished the Buddhist order in Sri Lanka in 1753. It was called the Siyam Nikaya after the "Kingdom of Siam".

It is said that in 1764, merely a decade after the re-establishment of the Buddhist order in Sri Lanka by reverend Upali, a group within the newly created Siyam Nikaya conspired and succeeded in restricting the Nikaya's higher ordination only to the Radala and Govigama caste, Sitinamaluwe Dhammajoti (Durawa) being the last nongovigama monk receive upasampada. This was a period when Buddhist Vinaya rules had been virtually abandoned and some members of the Buddhist Sangha in the Kandyan Kingdom privately held land, had wives and children, resided in the private homes and were called Ganinnanses. It was a period when the traditional nobility of the Kandyan Kingdom was decimated by continuous wars with the Dutch rulers of the Maritime Provinces. In the maritime provinces too a new order was replacing the old. Mandarampura Puvata, a text from the Kandyan peris, narrates the above radical changes to the monastic order and shows that it was not a unanimous decision by the body of the sangha. It says that thirty two ‘senior’ members of the Sangha who opposed this change were banished to Jaffna by the leaders of the reform. However, Queyroz mentions that in the 17th century no-one save appuhamies (gentlemen) and their relatives could be a monk, which suggests that elitism in the Buddhist order was of greater antiquity.

The Govigama exclusivity of the Sangha was challenged by other castes who, without the patronage of the King of Kandy or of the British, held their own upasampada ceremony at Totagamuwa Vihara in 1772. Another was held at Tangalle in 1798. Neither of these ceremonies were approved by the Siam Nikaya which claimed that these were not | in accordance with the Vinaya rules.

Hoping to rectify this situation, wealthy laymen from the maritime provinces financed an expedition to Burma to found a new monastic lineage. In 1799, Ambagahapitiye Gnanavimala Thera a monk from the Salagama caste, from Balapitiya on the south western coast of Sri Lanka, departed for Burma with a group of novices to seek a new succession of Higher ordination. The first bhikkhu was ordained in Burma in 1800 by the sangharaja of Burma in Amarapura, his party having been welcomed to Burma by King Bodawpaya.

The initial mission returned to Sri Lanka in 1803. Soon after their return to the island they established a udakhupkhepa sima (a flotilla of boats moved together to form a platform on the water) on the Maduganga river, Balapitiya and, under the most senior Burmese monk who accompanied them, held an upasampada ceremony on Vesak Full Moon Day. The new fraternity came to be known as the Amarapura Nikaya and was soon granted recognition by the colonial British government.

The Amarapura Nikaya was of pivotal importance in the revival of Buddhism in Sri Lanka in the 19th century. The Salagamas, who became overwhelmingly Buddhist, were in the vanguard of this movement.

Modern radicalism
The traditional Salagama areas around Balapitiya, Kosgoda, Ratgama, Hikkaduwa and Boossa were centres of the pan-Sinhalese populist movement of Anagarika Dharmapala(who was not from the Salagama community). The key issues around which this movement emerged were anti-casteism and anti-colonialism.

The same areas were in the vanguard of the independence struggle and became hotbeds of the Lanka Sama Samaja Party and of the Communist Party. These areas were at the forefront of the Hartal of 1953.

See also 

 Caste system in Sri Lanka

References

 Bryce Ryan, Caste in Modern Ceylon, Rutgers University Press, 1953.
 Fernăo de Queyroz (SG Perera, Tr), The Temporal and Spiritual Conquest of Ceylon, Colombo, Government Printer, 1930.

External links
 Troy David Osborne, A taste of Paradise: Cinnamon, James Ford Bell Library, University of Minnesota
 Ehelapola the great
 Ceylon Under the British Occupation
 Related Indian caste
 Upatissa the Chief Adviser of King Vijaya

Sinhalese castes